Harry Greaves (18 February 1895 – 5 April 1974) was an Australian rules footballer who played with Carlton in the Victorian Football League (VFL).

Notes

External links 

Harry Greaves's playing statistics from The VFA Project
Harry Greaves's profile at Blueseum

1895 births
1974 deaths
Australian rules footballers from Melbourne
Carlton Football Club players
Williamstown Football Club players
Footscray Football Club (VFA) players
People from Williamstown, Victoria